Hoseyn Hyati (also Romanized as Ḩoseyn Ḩyātī; also known as Kalāteh-ye Ḩoseyn Ḩyātī) is a village in Momenabad Rural District, in the Central District of Sarbisheh County, South Khorasan Province, Iran. At the 2006 census, its population was 34, in 9 families.

References 

Populated places in Sarbisheh County